The Classical School of the Medes (CSM) is a private English-based network of schools operating in the Kurdistan region. The headmaster is Mr. Yousif Matty.

History 
CSM began in response to requests from local church and government authorities to establish a school with English-based curriculum and international training support. The first CSM opened in The City Of Slemani in January 2001 and now enrolls 1000 students in kindergarten through 12th grade. A second CSM opened in Dohuk, Iraqi Kurdistan in the fall of 2002 and now enrolls 600  students (K1-G12). In September 2003, a third CSM campus opened in Hawler which enrolls 900 students (K-1-G11).

Students 
Over 95 percent of the students come from Kurdish Muslim families, with the remainder from Catholic Christians, Orthodox Christians, Evangelical Protestants, and other backgrounds. Many students are children of local government officials and community leaders.

Model of education 
CSM schools draw from the classical educational model and use English-based curriculum for most subjects; supplemental classes are taught in Kurdish and Arabic. The students take general SAT test during their high school years and four SAT subjects (Math lv.2, Physics, Biology and Chemistry).
The passing grade for subject tests is 600 and for general test is 1800.

Staff 
American staff typically teach one or two courses per semester, with the balance of their time spent in relationships with students, their families, and community contacts. All curriculum development, international staffing, and training is coordinated through Servant Group International, a US-based non-profit Christian organization.

Subjects 
Educators in America compile the program curriculum. Curriculum and supplies are shipped from America to Iraq each summer. 

Core subjects include:
 English language
 Kurdish language
 Arabic language 
 Mathematics 
 Science (usually branch per school year) 
 Humanities (emphasis on Ancient Mesopotamian, Roman and Greek history)
 Geography (for students of Grades 3, 4, and 5)
 Maps (for students of Grades 1, 2, and 6)
 Fairness (for students of K-G 2 and Grades 1, 2, 3, 4 )
 French and Spanish for Grades 9 and 10
 Linguistics (Grade 11)
 Mathematics level 2 (Senior year)

Celebrations 
 Dress Up Party (October 30 or 31)
 Thanksgiving (last Thursday of November)
 Valentine (February 12 or 14)
 Newroz Party (March 8)
 Spring Picnic (leaving April)
Christmas Party (December 25th)
Easter Party

Median Ink 
The Median Ink is the second English newspaper and the first school newspaper in Kurdistan, run by the high-schoolers and sold to everyone. An issue comes out every month and talks about in-school happenings and famous events outside school. The price of each issue is about 1000 IQD.

External links 
Medes School

Education in Kurdistan Region (Iraq)
Schools in Iraq
Educational institutions established in 2001
2001 establishments in Iraqi Kurdistan